Warp Works & Twentieth Century Masters is a 2-CD set consisting of live performances by the London Sinfonietta, released by Warp Records in 2006. It contains a mix of contemporary classical and minimalist music by John Cage, György Ligeti, Conlon Nancarrow, Steve Reich, Karlheinz Stockhausen, and Edgard Varèse, as well as instrumental versions of songs by Warp Records members Aphex Twin and Squarepusher. They were recorded live between 2003 and 2005.

Track listing
All songs performed by the London Sinfonietta except where noted.

  Recorded at Royal Festival Hall, March 8, 2003.
  Recorded at Brighton Dome, March 23, 2004.
  Recorded at Liverpool Philharmonic Hall, March 27, 2004
  Recorded at Henry Wood Hall, April 11, 2005

Live performances

Warsaw 
Selected arrangements created as part of the Warp Works & Twentieth Century Masters project were performed in Warsaw, Poland on May 13, 2004, as part of the "Turning Sounds 2" International Meeting (curated by Antoni Beksiak):

 Squarepusher (arr. Morgan Hayes): Port Rhombus
 Squarepusher (arr. David Horne): Disintegrations no. 1: The Tide
 Boards of Canada (arr. David Horne): Disintegrations no. 2: Pete Standing Alone
 Aphex Twin (arr. David Horne): Disintegrations no. 3: afx237 v. 7

by Białystok Symphony Orchestra under Franck Ollu, alongside Heiner Goebbels' Suite for Sampler and Orchestra, Bernhard Lang's DW8, as well as playing back the original electronic versions of the Warp artists' tracks.

References

20th-century classical music
Contemporary classical music
2006 live albums
Warp (record label) live albums